Thomas Whitefield (fl. 1378–1401) was an English politician.

He was Mayor of Hereford in the period November 1383 – October 1384 and in 1393–1395. He was elected a Member (MP) of the Parliament of England for Hereford in 1378 and 1401.

References

14th-century births
15th-century deaths
English MPs October 1383
English MPs 1401
Mayors of Hereford
English MPs 1393
English MPs 1394
English MPs 1395
English MPs 1378